Dance Again... the Hits is the first greatest hits album of American singer Jennifer Lopez. It was released on July 20, 2012, by Epic Records, to coincide with the launch of her first world tour, the Dance Again World Tour. Lopez previously conceived plans for a greatest hits album in 2009, but instead opted to use the material recorded for her seventh studio album, Love? (2011), which was released by Island Records in May 2011 after her departure from Epic Records in 2010. As Lopez owed the label one last album to fulfill her contract, she began work on a new greatest hits album in November 2011. She later became unsure whether she wanted to go along with plans to release a greatest hits album or a new studio album, eventually deciding on the former.

Dance Again... the Hits comprises eleven previously released tracks, and two new recordings: "Dance Again" and "Goin' In". A deluxe edition of the album was also released, featuring three additional previously released tracks, and a DVD featuring a selection of eleven music videos. The album received generally positive reviews from music critics, who praised it as a reflection of Lopez's success. Some critics expressed their disappointment in the absence of several successful singles, but deemed this as impressive, noting that this may have been due to the large volume of hit singles she has released over the years. Dance Again... The Hits was a moderate commercial success, peaking within the top ten in fourteen national charts, and the top twenty in ten national charts.

Background and development 

Following the commercial failure of her sixth studio album Brave (2007)—and while pregnant with twins Max and Emme—Lopez began working on new music for a future project in 2008. The project was kept under wraps until February 2009 when a new song from the recording sessions titled "Hooked on You" leaked online. Following the leak of "Hooked on You", "One Love" and "What Is Love?" were subsequently leaked online in May. The leaked songs were, at the time, meant to appear on a greatest hits album that later turned into a studio album.

"Louboutins", a song written and produced by The-Dream and C. "Tricky" Stewart, was released as the lead single from her seventh studio album, Love?, in November 2009. However, upon release, the song failed to garner enough airplay to chart, despite topping the US Billboard Hot Dance Club Songs chart. Lopez subsequently left Epic Records in February 2010, citing that she had fulfilled her contractual obligations and now wished to release Love? under a new label. Her departure from the label temporarily halted production on the album, however upon signing a new contract with Island Records, recording resumed on the album. The New York Daily News revealed that Lopez would be taking some of the records recorded under Epic Records to Island Records so that they could be included on the album.

"On the Floor", Lopez's first single with the label, was released in February 2011. The song topped the charts across the globe, becoming one of the most successful singles of the year. Following the release of "On the Floor", Love? produced two moderately successful singles: "I'm Into You" and "Papi", both of which topped the US Billboard Hot Dance Club Songs chart. Love? itself was a moderate commercial success and was viewed as a humble comeback from Lopez, as many had considered her recording career over. It was announced in November that Lopez was again working on new material for a greatest hits album. The following month, Lopez revealed that she had been playing some of her new music for L.A. Reid, who signed her to Island Records and left the label to become the CEO and chairman of Epic Records. This led further speculation that Lopez had moved back to Epic Records, which was first reported in July. The reports were later confirmed untrue, as Lopez was back with Epic Records because she owed the label one final album to end her contract, despite previously announcing that she had fulfilled her contract with them.

New material 

Lopez began working on a "collection of songs" in 2011, unaware of what she was "going to do with them". At the time, she was deciding whether she wanted to release a greatest hits album or a new studio album. Lopez stated that when it comes time to make an album, she doesn't sit down and write for the entire thing. She revealed that she is always working on new music and that her albums "happen organically" when she has recorded enough material. Lopez explained: "I don't ever stop. I keep going with it. These records, like 'Follow the Leader,' [a collaboration with Puerto Rican duo Wisin & Yandel] they just kind of came about. It wasn't something like, 'Oh, I'm going to sit down and make a record right now.'" Among the songs she recorded, two were chosen to be included on Dance Again... The Hits: "Dance Again" and "Goin' In".

The album's title and opening track, "Dance Again", was written by RedOne, Enrique Iglesias, Bilal "The Chef", AJ Junior and Pitbull, who is also featured in the song. After hearing a demo version of the track, she begged Iglesias to let her record the song, telling him that it was "her song". Lopez, who was going through a divorce with Marc Anthony and the "breakup of a family", felt as if the song had come to her at the "perfect moment". According to Lopez, the period was devastating because family is very important to her. Lopez revealed: "I had to turn that into something better"; she thought: "I don't want to just survive it, I want to come out better than that." Lopez didn't want to be "the woman who stayed in bed for months". "I knew I had to get through it. I'd dance every day, I'd work out, I'd say a little prayer and I still wouldn't feel any better. Then I'd go to bed and get up the next day and do it all again. It was a process, and it very gradually got a little easier ... I had to do it for my kids. I had to get through it for them." She re-wrote parts of the verses to better relate to her experiences. The song "helped lift her out of the darkness" and gave her hope again. Looking back on the song in December 2012, Lopez stated that: "'Dance Again' became my anthem ... an expression of what I needed to do at that time in my life and for what I was taking on with [my career]. It was a beautiful metaphor that became my reality."

Lopez's vocals for "Dance Again" were arranged by RedOne and produced by Kuk Harrell. They were recorded at Pinky's Palace. Pitbull's vocals were recorded by Al Burna at Al Burna Studios, Miami, Florida. Chris "Tek" O'Ryan and Trevor Muzzy handled audio engineering of the song, with assistance from Anthony Falcone and Peter Mack. O'Ryan and Trevor Muzzy were in charge of vocal editing. All instruments in the song were played and programmed by RedOne, who also produced the song. The song was later mixed by Trevor Muzzy. In an interview with Ryan Seacrest, Lopez revealed that she loved being able to collaborate with RedOne and Pitbull again. She stated: "We had a great chemistry the last time, and it was like 'We're going to have to do something again.' And this was the perfect song. I love the message of the song. That when something bad happens, your life is not over. You have to get up. You're gonna live. You're gonna to be okay. You're gonna dance again."

"Goin' In" was written by Michael Warren, Jamahl Listenbee, Joseph Angel, Coleridge Tillman, David Quiñones and Tramar Dillard. Lopez's vocals were produced by Harrell and recorded at Pinky's Palace. Josh Gudwin and O'Ryan handled audio engineering of the song, with assistance from Falcone and Mack. The song features additional vocals from American rapper Lil Jon. GoonRock produced and later mixed the song alongside Kenny Moran at The House on the Hill Studios in Los Angeles, California. Of GoonRock, Lopez commented by stating that he is "very forward with his sound". After recording her vocals for the song, Flo Rida recorded a rap verse for the song. Those involved in the production of the song were extremely happy with the song before Flo Rida's rap appeared on it, but once his vocals were on the song it "took it over the top top". When choosing who she wanted to feature on the song, Lopez had several other rappers in mind, such as Big Sean. Lopez revealed: "We had a couple of people who said yes, that they would get on it, but [Flo Rida] just seemed like the perfect one." She further explained that the style of the song "really fit Flo Rida"; "It was half-dance, but half kind of hard too."

Critical reception 

Dance Again... The Hits received generally positive reviews from contemporary music critics. At Metacritic, which assigns a normalized rating out of 100 to reviews from mainstream critics, the album received an average score of 72, based on four reviews, which indicates "generally favorable reviews". Sal Cinquemani of Slant Magazine wrote that the "most immediately striking thing" about the compilation is "just how many hits [she] has racked up over the years". "So many, in fact, that there's a hefty handful of singles missing from the standard edition of the album", using her number-one single "All I Have" as an example of this. He stated that Lopez's "output has been nothing if not on trend", and that Dance Again... The Hits plays not only as a chronicle of her music career, but of "pop music as a whole since just before the turn of the century", with genres spanning Latin pop, dance, and R&B. According to Cinquemani, the album also serves as a "historical record" of who the rappers du jour were "over the last dozen years or so", from Big Pun, Fat Joe, Ja Rule, and Lil Wayne. He concluded by stating that if the compilation "proves anything" it's that Lopez is, "if not the queen, then at least the duchess of reinvention and should never be counted out".

Michael Cragg of BBC Music wrote that it's "surprising that she hadn't unleashed a hits collection before now given that she's what you might politely call a 'singles artist'". He questioned the song choices, writing that the person who made the decision to not include "Papi" needs to have a "long, hard look in the mirror", although it's "hard to argue with most of what's on offer", Lopez "slipping effortlessly into different guises with each song". He concluded by stating that: "A cipher for good songs rather than the reasons those songs are good she may be, but there are few that do it better". Lewis Corner of Digital Spy too questioned the decisions of which songs appeared on the album, but wrote that: "the very fact that she can't fit all her classics on to one disc can be seen as nothing more than a testament to her enduring career". AllMusic's Stephen Thomas Erlewine pointed out that Lopez's other well or moderately charted songs such as "Play", "I'm Gonna Be Alright", "I'm Glad", and "Hold You Down" were not present on the compilation, while also writing that her older hits did not fit neatly with her newer songs and that its sequencing was "scattershot". Erlewine, nonetheless, said that "[the album] does have the familiar tunes, so it serves its purpose".

Irving Tan of Sputnikmusic put Dance Again... The Hits into the category of a greatest hits album that "you get facial brickbat of moderate-to-raw disappointment at the discovery of how thin and forced the artist's discography really is". He wrote that having another artist featured on nine of the thirteen tracks "gives the impression that as a product, having Jennifer Lopez alone is simply not enough". He further criticized the decision to include the Murder remixes of "Ain't It Funny" and "I'm Real" over the original studio versions, stating that it was almost like "Sony Music held their hands up and admitted that the initial cuts that they published simply weren't up to scratch". Tan concluded that for a greatest hits album, the track listing is "simply all over the place", with no indication that the record executives or Lopez "looked around for a logical start" or an "easy access ramp to her seven-album canon".

Commercial performance 
Dance Again... the Hits enjoyed moderate commercial success in the United States, peaking at number 20 on the Billboard 200 the week of its debut with sales of 14,000 copies. The album performed better on the Billboard R&B/Hip-Hop Albums component chart, where it managed to reach number six. After a month, the album had sold 38,000 copies in the United States. As of December 2012, Dance Again... the Hits is Lopez's second lowest charting effort in the country; only The Reel Me achieved a lower chart position in 2003, peaking at number 69. On the UK Albums Chart, Dance Again... the Hits debuted at number four with sales of 9,213 copies in its first week of release, matching the peak of J to Tha L-O!: The Remixes in that country. As of July 2020 the album has sold 126,000 Copies in the United States 

Overseas, Dance Again... the Hits performed well in most music markets, reaching the top ten in fourteen national charts, five of which were in the first five positions. Its highest position came from the Canadian Albums chart, where the album achieved number three. The album reached the same peak on the Italian Albums chart. Other countries where the album managed to score a high peak were Spain (number five), the Czech Republic (number six) and Switzerland (number seven). On the Australian Albums Chart, the album had a moderate commercial performance, reaching number 20; her previous compilation album, J to tha L–O! The Remixes, achieved a higher position of number 11. In Latin America, the album appeared on the Mexican Album chart, reaching a peak of number 10.

Track listing 

Notes
 signifies a vocal producer
 signifies an executive producer
 signifies a remixer

Credits and personnel 
Credits for Dance Again... the Hits adapted from AllMusic.

 Josie Aiello – background vocals
 Mert Alas – photography
 Justin Angel – background vocals
 Jim Annunziato – mixing, vocal engineer
 Tom Barney – bass
 Jane Barrett – background vocals
 Scotty Beatz – engineer
 Big Pun – vocals
 B-Money – scratching
 Al Burna – engineer, vocal engineer
 Michael "Banger" Cadahia – vocal engineer
 Caddillac Tah – vocals
 Maria Christiansen – background vocals
 Sean "Puffy" Combs – producer
 Margret Dorn – background vocals
 Ashanti Douglas – background vocals
 Tony Duran – photography
 Mikkel S. Eriksen – engineer, instrumentation
 Fabolous – vocals
 Fat Joe – featured artist
 Jose Fernando – vocals
 Flo Rida – vocals
 Alessandro Giulini – accordion
 Larry Gold – arranger, conductor
 GoMillion – photography
 GoonRock – mixing, producer
 Irv Gotti – mixing, producer
 Franklyn Grant – engineer
 Josh Gudwin – engineer, vocal engineer
 Kuk Harrell – producer, vocal arrangement, vocal editing, vocal engineer, vocal producer, background vocals
 Shawnyette Harrell – background vocals
 Rich Harrison – producer
 Alexei Hay – photography
 Tor Erik Hermansen – instrumentation
 Dan Hetzel – engineer, mixing
 Jean-Marie Horvat – mixing
 Ja Rule – vocals
 Jadakiss – vocals
 Jim Janik – mixing
 Rodney Jerkins – producer
 Richie Jones – arranger, drums, mixing, percussion, producer, programming, remixing
 Jennifer Karr – background vocals
 Peter Wade Keusch – engineer
 Eric Kupper – keyboards
 Dave Kutch – mastering
 Greg Lawson – arranger
 Damien Lewis – assistant engineer, engineer
 Lil Jon – vocals
 Lil Wayne – featured artist
 Jennifer Lopez – vocals
 Peter Mack – assistant
 Bill Makina – programming
 Manny Marroquin – mixing
 Milwaukee Buck – engineer
 Chieli Minucci – guitar
 Kenny Moran – mixing
 Trevor Muzzy – engineer, mixing, vocal editing
 Troy Oliver – drum programming, producer
 Jeanette Olsson – background vocals
 Chris "Tek" O'Ryan – engineer, vocal editing
 Marty Osterer – bass
 Julian Peploe – art direction, design
 Wendy Peterson – background vocals
 Marcus Piggott – photography
 Pitbull – vocals
 Poke and Tone – producer
 Prince Charles – engineer, mixing
 Rita Quintero – background vocals
 Natasha Ramos – background vocals
 RedOne – engineer, instrumentation, producer, programming, vocal arrangement, vocal editing, vocal producer
 Julio Reyes – engineer
 Cory Rooney – engineer, producer, remixing
 Marc Russell – assistant producer
 Dave Scheuer – arranger, engineer, producer
 Brian Springer – engineer, mixing
 Stargate – producer
 Styles P – vocals
 Bruce Swedien – engineer
 David Swope – engineer
 Phil Tan – mixing
 Ryan Tedder – engineer, producer
 Michael Thompson – photography
 Ric Wake – arranger, producer
 Miles Walker – engineer
 Robb Williams – engineer
 Thomas R. Yezzi – engineer

Charts

Weekly charts

Year-end charts

Certifications

Release history

See also 
2012 in American music

References

External links 
 Dance Again... the Hits at Metacritic

Jennifer Lopez albums
2012 greatest hits albums
Epic Records compilation albums
Albums produced by RedOne
Albums produced by Rodney Jerkins
Albums produced by Ryan Tedder
Albums produced by Sean Combs
Albums produced by Stargate
Albums produced by Trackmasters
Albums produced by Kuk Harrell
Albums produced by Cory Rooney
Albums produced by Julio Reyes Copello